The Tulane University School of Medicine is located in New Orleans, Louisiana, United States and is a part of Tulane University. The school is located in the Medical District of the New Orleans Central Business District.

History

The school was founded in 1834 as the Medical College of Louisiana and is the 15th oldest medical school in the United States and the 2nd oldest in the deep south. The first classes were held in 1835 at a variety of locations, including Charity Hospital and the Strangers Unitarian Church.

Founding
In October 1832, Dr. Warren Stone, a young physician who received his medical degree from the Medical School of Pittsfield, Massachusetts, was one of 108 passengers aboard an ill-fated brig, the Amelia, which set sail from New York to New Orleans carrying valuable cargo. On the fourth day out, a terrific storm occurred; the passengers were put below and the hatches were
battened down. When the storm lifted, it was discovered that twenty-five passengers were in advanced stages of cholera. On October 30, the Amelia attempted unsuccessfully to make the Charleston harbor. Leaking badly, she was beached on Folly Island and had to be burned. Her passengers were made as comfortable as possible. Charleston Port authorities quarantined the island and put a young physician, Thomas Hunt, in charge of the situation with Dr. Stone as first assistant. The experiences shared by the two young
doctors brought them into a friendship, which lasted throughout their lives. They were on Folly Island for three weeks, during which time Dr. Stone ignited the imagination of Hunt with the great medical possibilities in epidemic-ridden Louisiana. It is said that these two kindred spirits discussed plans for a medical college in New Orleans.  After several weeks, the quarantine was lifted, and Warren Stone departed for New Orleans while Hunt returned to his home in Charleston, accompanied by an attack of cholera. Hunt resolved to join Stone in New Orleans as soon as possible. When Dr. Stone arrived in New Orleans, he found the city plagued with epidemics of yellow fever and cholera. He immediately accepted a position at Charity Hospital, which had just been completed. When Hunt later reached New Orleans, he also joined the staff of Charity Hospital, all the while cherishing his dream of a medical college in the city. In addition to resuming his friendship with Stone, he also became associated with other young physicians: John Hoffman Harrison, Thomas Ingalls, Charles A. Luzenberg, James Monroe Mackie, Augustus Cenas, and Edwin Bathurst Smith. Men of vision, energy, and determination, all were graduates of reputable medical schools. Realizing the need for educated physicians in the South, they visualized the growth of a medical school in New Orleans built around the clinics of Charity Hospital. When Dr. Hunt was ready to begin the project of which he had long dreamed, he turned to Drs. Stone, Luzenberg, and Harrison. "These four pooled their resources, making a sort of informal, unchartered stock company, chose the other doctors to help, [and] divided up the fields of instruction..."1 A Prospectus was published in The Bee (September 1834), written by Thomas Hunt and bearing the signatures of Drs. Hunt, Luzenberg, Harrison, Mackie, Cenas, Ingalls, and Smith. The daring, optimistic Prospectus stated that the young doctors hoped to "...advance the cause of science, and to disseminate rational principles so as to remove or alleviate human suffering..."2 Although the Prospectus was received with catcalls rather than enthusiasm, the young physicians' determination remained undaunted.

Late 1800s to present
The first permanent building for the school was constructed in the French Quarter in 1844. In 1893, the school moved to Canal Street in the Richardson building, and then shortly after to the Hutchison Building, also on Canal. Finally, in 1930, the school moved to its current location—the Hutchinson Memorial Building—on Tulane Avenue, next to Charity Hospital.

In 2007, the school acquired the Murphy Oil Building on S. Robertson by donation.  The Murphy building houses the DeBakey Educational Center, a simulation center, a student lounge with gym, and several administrative offices.

The school refused to fill out the U.S. News statistical survey, and so is unranked for both Research and Primary Care by U.S. News & World Report.

Admissions and research
The school has highly competitive admissions, accepting only 175 medical students from more than 12,000 applications. About 40 percent of the students in each class are concurrently enrolled as candidates for the Master of Public Health degree in the School of Public Health and Tropical Medicine. It is estimated that Tulane University has graduated more than 40 percent of all physicians in the U.S. who have earned both M.D. and master of public health degrees.

In 2001, the Tulane Center for Gene Therapy started as the first major center in the U.S. to focus on research using adult stem cells.

Today, the medical school is but one part of the Tulane University Health Sciences Center, which includes the School of Medicine, the Tulane University Hospital and Clinic, the School of Public Health and Tropical Medicine, the University Health Service, the Tulane National Primate Research Center, the U.S.-Japan Biomedical Research Laboratories, and the Tulane/Xavier Center for Bioenvironmental Research. Most components of the Health Sciences Center are located in the heart of New Orleans, in the medical district that comprises Tulane facilities and the LSU/Charity Hospital center just north of the New Orleans Central Business District. It comprises 20 academic departments: Anesthesiology, Biochemistry, Family and Community Medicine, Medicine, Microbiology and Immunology, Neurosurgery, Obstetrics and Gynecology, Ophthalmology, Orthopaedics, Otolaryngology, Pathology and Laboratory Medicine, Pediatrics, Pharmacology, Physiology, Psychiatry and Neurology, Radiology, Structural and Cellular Biology, Surgery and Urology.

The school periodically hosts social events with the Tulane University Law School and the Freeman School of Business.

On August 31, 2009, Louisiana Governor Bobby Jindal along with Tulane President Scott Cowen and Louisiana State University System President John V. Lombardi approved a plan to establish both schools as board members for the future $1.1 billion University Medical Center New Orleans. Ground was broken in 2011 and the hospital opened on August 1, 2015. The 446-bed hospital serves as the flagship for Tulane medical students and residents.

Facilities
 Tulane's Medical Library, The Rudolph Matas Health Sciences Library, is named after the renowned Professor of Surgery at Tulane University Rudolph Matas, despite the journal Science stating of Matas that "his colleagues have felt for many years that by consulting him they could extract more information from his encyclopedic mind than they could obtain from a visit to a library." (Science, 1934)
 The Tulane Center for Advanced Medical Simulation and Team Training gives medical students, residents, practicing physicians, nurses, technicians, first responders and other healthcare providers the opportunity to learn and perfect the latest techniques and best practices for patient care and safety. The Tulane Sim Center features  of real-life environments and meeting space for hands-on training, instruction and skills assessment including an Emergency Room, Intensive Care Unit, Operating Room, Labor & Delivery room, 4 Hospital Patient Rooms, 4 Office Exam Rooms, and a Nurses Station. The Tulane University: Standardized Patient Center through Foundations in Medicine is the first to pilot low-cost Virtual Reality through Google Cardboard for first year medical students.

Notable alumni and faculty

James Andrews (physician), M.D., Former house staff, orthopedics (1969–1972), internationally known orthopedic surgeon and sports medicine specialist.  Founder of American Sports Medicine Institute, member of the Sports medicine Committee of the United States Olympic Committee. team physician for a number of professional and collegiate teams.  Surgeon to numerous professional athletes including Jack Nicklaus, Michael Jordan, Emmitt Smith, John Smoltz, Brett Favre, Drew Brees, Troy Aikman, Charles Barkley, Bo Jackson, and many others.
Charles Cassidy (C.C.) Bass, M.D., 1899, pioneer researcher on malaria, hookworm, and dental caries; Dean, Tulane School of Medicine, 1922-40 (Tulane's Golden Years).
Elizabeth Bass, M.D., 1911, one of the first women faculty at the medical school, three years before women were admitted as students
Stanhope Bayne-Jones, Military Physician and Academic, noted for his contributions to the link between smoking and cancer.
Cyril Y. Bowers, M.D., Emeritus Professor of Medicine
George E. Burch, M.D., 1933, internationally known cardiologist; Editor, American Heart Journal. 1959-1982; Chairman of the World Health Organization Expert Advisory Panel on Cardiovascular Diseases and Chairman of the Advisory Committee to the U.S. Army on Environmental Medicine and Physiology involved in successfully sending the first two chimpanzees into space, continuing as a consultant to NASA
Alston Callahan M.D., 1933, pioneer in the field of reconstructive eye surgery; established the Eye Foundation Hospital in Birmingham, Alabama; instrumental in starting the Ophthalmology Department at the University of Alabama School of Medicine and served as first Chairman
Jay Cavanaugh, Ph.D, 1994, member, California State Board of Pharmacy (1980–90), director, American Alliance for Medical Cannabis, 2001
Max Dale Cooper, M.D., M, 1957, Former House Staff (Peds), 2019 Albert Lasker Award for Basic Medical Research (with Jacques Miller) for their discovery of the two distinct classes of lymphocytes, B and T cells – a monumental achievement that provided the organizing principle of the adaptive immune system and launched the course of modern immunology
Harold Cummins, M.D., anatomist, Emeritus professor of Anatomy
Charity Dean, M.D., MPH&TM, epidemiologist, assistant director of the California Department of Public Health in 2020 during the COVID-19 pandemic in the United States, co-founder and CEO of The Public Health Company. 
Michael E. DeBakey, M.D., 1932, pioneer of modern medicine (cardiovascular surgery) and recipient of the Congressional Gold Medal
David John Doukas, M.D., Professor and James A. Knight Chair of Medical Humanities and Ethics in Medicine
H. Tristram Engelhardt, Jr., M.D.; Ph.D. Tulane 1972. American philosopher specializing in continental philosophy and medical ethics. Professor of philosophy at Rice University.
Paul Finger, M.D., 1982, pioneered the use of palladium-103 plaque radiation to treat choroidal melanoma and 3D and high-frequency ultrasound to image intraocular tumors.
Arthur Gottlieb M.D., faculty (1975–1988), Chairman of the Department of Microbiology and Immunology and professor of Medicine
Louis J. Ignarro, faculty (1973–1985), Nobel Prize in Physiology or Medicine (1998)
Thomas Naum James, M.D., 1949, director, World Health Organization cardiovascular center
Ruth L. Kirschstein, M.D., 1951, director, National Institutes of Health, for whom the Kirschstein NRSA grant program is named
Rudolph Matas, M.D., 1880, "father of vascular surgery"
William Larimer Mellon, Jr., M.D., M’53, founder, Albert Schweitzer Hospital, Haiti
Alton Ochsner, faculty, founder of Ochsner Clinic, pioneer anti-smoking advocate, President of the American Cancer Society, President of the American College of Surgeons, President of the  International Society of Surgeons, Chairman of the Section on Surgery for the  American Medical Association, and President of the Alton Ochsner Medical Foundation; received the Distinguished Service Award of the American Medical Association in 1967; popularized blood typing and blood transfusion in Europe; physician to Argentina's Juan Perón.
Donald J. Palmisano, M.D., A&S 1960, M 1963, President of the American Medical Association.
Felix Octave Pavy, M.D. 1904, member of the Louisiana House of Representatives for St. Landry Parish from 1932 to 1936.
Leslie Vaughn Rush, the surgeon who performed first successful bone pinning
Joseph F. Sackett, M.D., neuroradiologist and professor of radiology
Andrew V. Schally, former faculty, Nobel Prize in Physiology or Medicine (1977), French Legion of Honor
Luther Leonidas Terry, M.D., 1935, U.S. surgeon general (1961–1965)
Lewis Thomas, former faculty (1948–1950), physician, researcher, and essayist
E. M. Toler, physician and coroner who served in the Louisiana State Senate from East and West Feliciana parishes from 1944 to 1954; graduate of Vanderbilt University School of Medicine in 1900, studied surgery at Tulane in 1905 and 1906 
Paul Wehrle, physician who helped develop of methods to prevent and treat polio and smallpox
Benjamin B. Weinstein, a gynecologist and pioneer in the study of Reproductive Medicine. He was a founding member and President (1953-54) of the American Society for Reproductive Medicine, and founding member of the Tulane Medical School History of Medicine Society
Maxwell Wintrobe, M.D.; Ph.D., Tulane, 1929, faculty (1927–30), pioneer in hematology developing method for hematocrit and sedimentation rate measurement and Wintrobe indices (MCV, MCH, MCHC) while at Tulane.  Rewriting Musser's chapter on Diseases of Blood for Tice Practice of Medicine subsequently becomes the basis for Wintrobe's Clinical Hematology textbook.

Popular culture references
St. Elsewhere: Howie Mandel's character, Dr. Wayne Fiscus, attended Tulane Medical School.
Frasier: In the episode "Rooms with a View," when speaking of Niles' heart surgeon's past, Frasier remarks, "You all know how I feel about Tulane Medical School."
Grey's Anatomy: Dr. Preston Burke graduated from Tulane University for undergrad, and can be seen sporting his university's T-shirt in a few scenes after he's finished exercising or woken up.

Affiliations
 Tulane Medical Center
 University Medical Center New Orleans
 Ochsner Medical Center
 Veterans Affairs Medical Center
 Tulane School of Public Health and Tropical Medicine

Clinical departments
 Department of Anesthesiology
 Department of Biochemistry
  Department of Immunology
 Department of Family and Community Medicine
 Department of Medicine
 Department of Microbiology
 Department of Neurosurgery
 Department of Obstetrics and Gynecology
 Department of Ophthalmology
 Department of Orthopaedics		
 Department of Otolaryngology
 Department of Pathology and Laboratory Medicine
 Department of Pediatrics
 Department of Pharmacology
 Department of Physiology
 Department of Psychiatry and Neurology
 Department of Radiology
 Department of Structural and Cellular Biology
 Department of Surgery
 Department of Urology

Centers
 Center for Gene Therapy
 Center for Infectious Diseases
 General Clinical Research Center
 Hayward Genetics Center
 Hypertension and Renal Center
 Tulane Center for Clinical Effectiveness and Prevention (TCCEP)
 Center for Bioenvironmental Research at Tulane and Xavier Universities
 Tulane Center for Advanced Medical Simulation and Team Training

Programs
 Clinical Research Curriculum Award Training Program
 Graduate Program in Biomedical Sciences
 Human Genetics Program
 Neuroscience
 Physiology

TUHC Centers of Excellence
 Depaul-Tulane Behavioral Health Center
 Tulane Cancer Center
 Tulane Center for Abdominal Transplant
 Tulane Hospital for Children
 Tulane Institute of Sports Medicine
 Tulane-Xavier National Women's Center
 Tulane Cardiovascular Center of Excellence

References

External links
 NIH Article

Medicine
Medical schools in Louisiana
Educational institutions established in 1834
1834 establishments in Louisiana